"Be Thankful for What You Got" is a soul song written and first performed by William DeVaughn. The record sold nearly two million copies on its release in spring of 1974, reaching #1 on the U.S. R&B charts and #4 on the Billboard Hot 100 chart. In 2021, it was listed at No. 374 on Rolling Stone's "Top 500 Greatest Songs of All Time".

The song is noted for its repeated line: "Diamond in the back, sunroof top, diggin' the scene with a gangsta lean", which has been sampled and interpolated in many songs.

Background
DeVaughn wrote "A Cadillac Don't Come Easy", eventually re-written to become "Be Thankful for What You Got" in 1972, and spent $900 toward it under a development agreement, under which an artist will record a few initial demos or tracks where, if successfully approved, the company may reserve the right to extend the arrangement to Omega Sound, a Philadelphia production house, and release the song.

The session featured members of the MFSB group — guitarist Norman Harris, drummer Earl Young, bassist Rusty Jackman, vibist Vince Montana and conga player Larry Washington — secured by Allan Felder, who also developed the separate ad lib back-up chorus with his sister's vocal choir. Frank Fioravanti then secured the song's release on the Roxbury Records record label, run by producer-songwriter Wes Farrell.

With a sound and content influenced by Curtis Mayfield (and often erroneously attributed to him), its simple and encouraging lyrics hit home, to the extent that it became featured on gospel radio stations.

The edited version, which is the first part of the song, became a hit. The other half of the song is a longer instrumental with the repeated chords and rhythm before the final chorus comes in. The song is seven minutes long and radio stations preferred the sung portions over the instrumental portions.

Chart history

Weekly charts

Year-end charts

1980 remake
In 1980, DeVaughn recorded a remake, on his second album, Figures Can't Calculate, that hit #83 on the dance chart and #44 on the UK singles chart.

Later uses
The song is featured in the films Bug (2002), Be Cool (2005)  and La Mission (2010).

The song's refrain "Diamond in the back, sunroof top, diggin' the scene with a gangsta lean" has been referenced, sampled and/or interpolated in the following songs:
 "P. Funk (Wants to Get Funked Up)" by Parliament-Funkadelic (1975) ("Gangster lean; Y'all should dig my sun-roof top")
 "Keep Smiling" by Gabor Szabo (1976)
 "Gangsta Gangsta" by N.W.A (1988)
 "Keepin' the Faith" by De La Soul, from their 1991 album De La Soul Is Dead ("Diamond in the back, sunroof top, waiting for the credit card so she can go and shop")
 "Brakes" by De La Soul on the 1996 album Stakes Is High
 "West Savannah" by Outkast (1998) ("Nine in my hand, ounce in my crotch, diggin' the scene with a gangsta slouch")
 "Diamond in the Back" by Ludacris (2004)
 "Still Fly" by Big Tymers (2002) ("old-school Caddy with a diamond in the back")
 "Shut Up and Drive" by Rihanna (2007)
 "Shootin' The Gift" by Hip Club Groove ("Moves is in the back, let the beat drop, diggin’ the scene, with Mackenzie and me").
 "Sonate Pacifique" by L'Imperatrice (2014)

Covers

Massive Attack version
Massive Attack's cover version, retitled "Be Thankful for What You've Got", was featured on their 1991 debut album Blue Lines. A music video was produced for the song; however, it was not released as a stand-alone commercial single. Instead, a remix by Paul Oakenfold was also included on their 1992 single release Massive Attack EP.

Massive Attack EP track listing:
 "Hymn of the Big Wheel" (Nellee Hooper Remix) – 4:47
 "Home of the Whale" – 4:02
 "Be Thankful for What You've Got" (Paul Oakenfold Remix) – 4:36
 "Any Love" (Larry Heard Remix) – 4:27

Lipbone Redding version
Lawrence "Lipbone" Redding's cover version, "Be Thankful for What You Got", appeared on his 2009 EP Lipbone Redding and the LipBone Orchestra: Science of Bootyism, Beautiful Flying Records. The EP contains two versions of the song.

Other covers
Other artists who have covered the song include:
 The Intruders on their 1974 album Energy of Love
 Arthur Lee and Love on their 1974 album Reel to Real
 Donovan Carless in a reggae style in 1974
 Bunny Clarke, in a reggae style (produced by Lee "Scratch" Perry) in 1975
 Winston Curtisin a reggae style in 1984 (on World International Records)
 Sunset Gun in 1984 for CBS
 Peter Blakeley as the opening theme for the 1991  movie The Taking of Beverly Hills
 Portrait on the 1993 soundtrack album Addams Family Values: Music from the Motion Picture
 Yo La Tengo on their 1997 EP Little Honda
 Vibraphone player Craig Peyton for Profile Records 1983, electro sequencer arrangement.
 Cleveland Watkiss on Blessing in Disguise (Polydor 1991).
 Omar Lye-Fook featuring Erykah Badu on his 2001 album Best By Far (titled "Be Thankful")
 Rumer on her 2015 EP Love is the Answer
 The Space Lady on her 2018 album On the Streets of Dreams

Notes

Sources
Nathan, David. Notes for William DeVaughn: Be Thankful for What You Got: A Golden Classics Edition. Collectables [sic] CD COL-5271. Collectables [sic] Record Corp., 1994.

External links
 Lyrics of this song
 

1974 singles
1992 singles
2009 singles
Massive Attack songs
1972 songs
Cadillac